Leusden is a municipality and a town in the Netherlands, in the province of Utrecht. It is located about 3 kilometres southeast of Amersfoort.

The western part of the municipality lies on the slopes of the Utrecht Hill Ridge and is largely covered by forest and heathlands. The eastern parts lie in the Gelderse Vallei and are mostly agricultural.

Former Amersfoort concentration camp lies just within the northern municipal border with Amersfoort.

Population centres 

The municipality of Leusden contains four villages:

 Leusden, originally named "Hamersveld" and later "Leusden-Centrum";
 Leusden-Zuid, formerly "Leusbroek"
 Achterveld
 Stoutenburg

There are also a number of hamlets in the municipality:

The town of Leusden 
The place that is now called Leusden was first mentioned as Villa Lisiduna in a charter in 777. The exact location of that settlement, which is considered to have been a rather extensive farm complex with defenses, is unknown to us. It is possible that the old village of Oud-Leusden once was the location of Villa Lisiduna but excavations in the 1980s have not provided any evidence. However, the church tower of Oud-Leusden is one of the oldest towers in the Netherlands, dating back at least to the 11th century A.D. Close to Leusden is the site of the former monastery Heiligenberg, founded around the year 1000 by bishop Ansfridus of Utrecht, who died here in 1010.

In the 1970s, the agricultural villages of Leusbroek and Hamersveld grew together into a larger, mainly residential town. What once was Hamersveld is now called Leusden-Centrum, now commonly Leusden, and Leusbroek was to become Leusden-Zuid. In the original plans, Leusden was to grow into a town of around 46,000 inhabitants. After the initial expansion there was a growing resistance from the population, so some of the later phases of expansion have been abandoned.

Shopping areas 
In Leusden there are 3 shopping centres:

1.) The Hamershof, this is the biggest mall with about 80 stores in the centre of Leusden. The oldest part opened in 1980 together with the Town Hall nearby the Hamershof.

2.) The Biezenkamp, this is the second shopping centre in the centre of town, there are not more than 20 shops.

3.) The Zuidhoek in the new neighborhood the Tabaksteeg, there are just 5 shops located around the square.

Notable residents 

 Gerrit Achterberg (1905-1962 in Leusden) a poet 
 Arleen Auger (1939-1993 in Leusden) an American soprano 
 Robby Valentine (born 1968 in Leusden) singer and multi-instrumentalist
 Marieke Wijsman (born 1975 in Leusden) former speed-skater, competed at the 1988 and 2002 Winter Olympics 
 Marike Jager (born 1979) a Dutch singer-songwriter, guitarist and TV presenter, grew up in Leusden
 Haike van Stralen (born 1983 in Leusden) a Dutch former freestyle swimmer, who competed at the 2000 and 2004 Summer Olympics

Image gallery

References

External links 

 Official website

 
Municipalities of Utrecht (province)
Populated places in Utrecht (province)
New towns started in the 1970s